Kosmos 211 ( meaning Cosmos 211), also known as DS-P1-Yu No.13 was a Soviet satellite which was used as a radar calibration target for tests of anti-ballistic missiles. It was built by the Yuzhnoye Design Bureau, and launched in 1968 as part of the Dnepropetrovsk Sputnik programme.

A Kosmos-2I 63SM carrier rocket was used to launch Kosmos 211 from Site 133/3 at Plesetsk Cosmodrome. The launch occurred at 11:26:25 GMT on 9 April 1968, and resulted in the successful deployment of Kosmos 211 into a low Earth orbit. Upon reaching orbit, it was assigned its Kosmos designation, and received the International Designator 1968-028A.

It remained in orbit until it decayed and reentered the atmosphere on 10 November 1968. It was the twelfth of seventy nine DS-P1-Yu satellites to be launched, and the eleventh of seventy two to successfully reach orbit.

See also

 1968 in spaceflight

References

Spacecraft launched in 1968
Kosmos 0211
1968 in the Soviet Union
Dnepropetrovsk Sputnik program